Niklas Krütten (born 20 October 2002) is a German racing driver who currently competes in the European Le Mans Series driving an Oreca 07 LMP2 for Cool Racing as well as in the ADAC GT Masters driving a BMW M4 GT3 for Schubert Motorsport. He is the 2021 European Le Mans Series LMP3 runner-up and the 2020 Euroformula Open rookies' champion. He won the silver medal in the Formula 4 Cup at the 2019 FIA Motorsport Games, and previously raced in the Italian, ADAC and UAE Formula 4 championships. Krütten is an ADAC Stiftung Sport alumni.

Career
2023 saw Krütten compete in the GT World Challenge Europe for the first time in his career. He would line up for Team WRT in both the Sprint Cup and Endurance Cup alongside Calan Williams, with Jean-Baptiste Simmenauer joining for the Endurance Cup.

Racing record

Racing career summary 

† As Krütten was a guest driver, he was ineligible to score points.* Season still in progress.

Complete ADAC Formula 4 Championship results
(key) (Races in bold indicate pole position) (Races in italics indicate fastest lap)

Complete FIA Motorsport Games results

Complete Euroformula Open Championship results 
(key) (Races in bold indicate pole position) (Races in italics indicate fastest lap)

Complete European Le Mans Series results
(key) (Races in bold indicate pole position; results in italics indicate fastest lap)

Complete 24 Hours of Le Mans results

Complete ADAC GT Masters results
(key) (Races in bold indicate pole position) (Races in italics indicate fastest lap)

References

External links 
 
 

Living people
2002 births
German racing drivers
Euroformula Open Championship drivers
European Le Mans Series drivers
Sportspeople from Trier
Racing drivers from Rhineland-Palatinate
24 Hours of Le Mans drivers
ADAC Formula 4 drivers
Italian F4 Championship drivers
WeatherTech SportsCar Championship drivers
ADAC GT Masters drivers
FIA Motorsport Games drivers
Mücke Motorsport drivers
Van Amersfoort Racing drivers
Motopark Academy drivers
United Autosports drivers
Karting World Championship drivers
Nürburgring 24 Hours drivers
UAE F4 Championship drivers
Le Mans Cup drivers
W Racing Team drivers